Gabriel Valongo da Silva better known as Gabriel (Camaçari, June 30, 1987) is a Brazilian footballer who plays as a center back for Luverdense.

Career statistics

(Correct )

Honours
Avaí
Campeonato Catarinense: 2010

Contract
 a three-year contract with Atlético Paranaense.
 a one-year loan deal with Guarani. (June 2011 to May 2012)

References

External links
 soccerway
 Avaí

1987 births
Living people
Brazilian footballers
Avaí FC players
Club Athletico Paranaense players
Guarani FC players
Associação Desportiva São Caetano players
Association football central defenders